Hector Velázquez Martínez (born 5 March 1975) is a Mexican former professional boxer. An over 20-year veteran of the sport, he has challenged twice for a world title; the WBC lightweight title in 2009, and the WBC super featherweight title in 2010. He also held the IBA featherweight title in 2000.

Professional career
Velázquez began his professional career on 16 December 1993, beating fellow debutant José Guardado. He has fought world champions such as Kevin Kelley, Israel Vazquez, Raul Perez, Robbie Peden, Guty Espadas Jr., Rocky Juarez, Manny Pacquiao, Elio Rojas, Edwin Valero, Jorge Linares, Mickey Bey, Paul Spadafora, Thomas Dulorme, Michael Farenas, Bobby Pacquiao, and Mario Santiago.

Professional boxing record

External links
 

1975 births
Living people
Boxers from Nayarit
People from Santiago Ixcuintla
Featherweight boxers
Mexican male boxers